Jean-Claude Georges Suaudeau (born 24 May 1938) is a French former professional football manager and player.

He played as a midfielder with FC Nantes from 1963 to 1969 and then managed the youth teams from 1973 to 1982. From 1982 to 1988 and from 1991 to 1997 he coached the main team winning the championship twice in 1983 and 1995.

Honours

Player
Nantes
Division 1: 1964–65, 1965–66
Coupe de la Ligue: 1964–65
Challenge des Champions: 1965

Manager
Nantes
Division 1:  1982–83, 1994–95

Orders
Chevalier of the Ordre national du Mérite: 1999

References

External links
 
 

1938 births
Living people
People from Cholet
Sportspeople from Maine-et-Loire
French footballers
France international footballers
Association football midfielders
Ligue 1 players
FC Nantes players
French football managers
FC Nantes managers
Ligue 1 managers
Knights of the Ordre national du Mérite
Footballers from Pays de la Loire